Airways News is a source of continuously updated news about the commercial aviation industry. The site covers such topics as breaking domestic and global aviation news, aircraft and engine manufacturers, aviation technology, aviation security, the passenger experience, business analysis, airports, flight routes and timetables and passports and visas.

History
The site was formed as an alliance between the former Airchive.com and Airways Magazine. The rebranded website, launched in September 2014, combines the expertise, resources and staffing of both aviation industry publications.

Airchive.com originated in 2003 as a historical photo database before evolving into an aviation news outlet with coverage updated daily. The site's aviation industry coverage and commentary have appeared regularly in Forbes, CNET, Business Insider and USA Today. It was founded by Chris Sloan, an aviation enthusiast and veteran reporter who also serves as president and founder of television production company, 2C Media, which produces TV shows and promos for national cable and broadcast networks.

Airways Magazine, launched in 1994, focuses on the aviation industry's operators, aircraft, technology, manufacturers, airports, destinations, people and airways. The magazine has published more than 219 issues and is distributed through newsstands in North America and 35 nations worldwide, reaching subscribers in more than 60 countries.

In September 2014, it was announced that veteran aviation journalist Benét J. Wilson would become the site's co-editor-in-chief effective October 6, 2014.

References

External links
 

Internet properties established in 2014
American technology news websites
2014 establishments in the United States
Aviation in the United States